{{DISPLAYTITLE:C9H21N3}}
The molecular formula C9H21N3 (molar mass: 171.28 g/mol, exact mass: 171.1735 u) may refer to:

 2-tert-Butyl-1,1,3,3-tetramethylguanidine
 1,4,7-Trimethyl-1,4,7-triazacyclononane